Grass Patch is a small town in the Goldfields-Esperance region of Western Australia, located 79 km north of Esperance on the Coolgardie-Esperance Highway. The town was named after a nearby farm of the same name that had been settled around 1896 and was renowned for bountiful crops and good grass. The town is part of the Shire of Esperance, and services the local farming community.

History
The townsite was proposed in 1910 when land in the area was being opened up, and as a watering spot for the planned Esperance to Norseman Railway, which was completed 15 years later.  Although the area was already well known as "Grass Patch", locals sought a more suitable name for the town when it was gazetted in 1923. Of the three nominated, "Warden" was chosen. However, objections were soon raised about this name and later the same year it was changed back to Grass Patch.

The poor quality of the soil in the surrounding district made the development of farming in the area difficult and unproductive.  In 1949 the Esperance Downs Research Station was established and it was discovered that the soil in the Esperance region was deficient in certain trace elements. The addition of these trace elements to the soil has since improved fertility and crop yields a great deal, and the region has become an important agricultural district, successfully producing wheat, barley, canola, sheep and cattle. The town is a receival site for Cooperative Bulk Handling.

References

Towns in Western Australia
Shire of Esperance
Grain receival points of Western Australia